The 1911–12 Scottish Cup was the 39th staging of Scotland's most prestigious football knockout competition. The Cup was won by Celtic who defeated Clyde in the final.

Semi-finals

Final

Teams

See also
1911–12 in Scottish football

References

1911-12
1911–12 domestic association football cups
Cup